Fronimo may refer to:
                                             
Fronimo (software), a software program for engraving of tabulature
Fronimo Dialogo, a book by Vincenzo Galilei